, is a name of a costumed character played by Tomoaki Imakuni and created for the promotion of Pokémon series related products and services. Imakuni? appeared in many promotional live events conducted in Japan between 1997 and 2002, although his visibility has since declined.

Activities 
Imakuni? has written songs for the Pokémon anime, and is known for singing in Japanese commercials for the franchise. He is also credited as a designer for Nintendo 64 game Pokémon Stadium and Nintendo DS game Pokémon Ranger: Shadows of Almia.

Imakuni? is listed as the illustrator on several cards for the Pokémon Trading Card Game.

In 2003, he performed in the non-Pokémon related song , with animation produced by Creatures for NHK's Minna no Uta. Like most of the Japanese Pokémon songs up to that point (including anime opening and ending songs), this was composed by Hirokazu Tanaka.

While live appearances have declined, Imakuni?'s activity continued through a now-defunct blog run by Creatures Inc. as well as an active Twitter account.

Appearance 
Over the years, he has had several costumes, all which have round, Mickey Mouse-style ears.
Round ears, black costume with "イマクニ？" embroidered on the front. (1996–early 2000s)
Curly round ears, black costume with "イマクニ？" on an LCD screen on the front of his costume.
Round curly ears, silver costume with "イマクニ？" on the front of his costume.

Pokémon Trading Card Game 
Imakuni? appears as an enemy in the Pokémon Trading Card Game for the Game Boy Color, as well as the game's 2001 Japan-exclusive sequel.  The game also features a Trainer Card of the same name, which has been ranked among the worst and strangest cards in the Pokemon Trading Card Game, due to its mechanic being harmful to the player who uses it. A physical printing of the card was first distributed to 2,000 winners of a 1997 contest hosted by magazine CoroCoro, where Imakuni? appeared in a two-page feature answering questions about the card game. The Imakuni? card was later given an English reprint in the 2016 set Generations.

A related card, Imakuni?'s Doduo, was also released in the subsequent 2016 set XY – Evolutions.

References

External links
 
Archived website

Video game musicians
Pokémon